Bracken is a village in the Canadian province of Saskatchewan within the Rural Municipality of Lone Tree No. 18 and Census Division No. 4. The village is named after John Bracken, Premier of Manitoba and leader of the Progressive Conservative Party of Canada, who was a professor at the University of Saskatchewan. The small village is located approximately 160 km south of the City of Swift Current on Highway 18, directly north of Grasslands National Park, and approximately 20 km north of the Montana-Saskatchewan border.

History 
Bracken incorporated as a village on January 4, 1926.

Demographics 

Attractions 
Grasslands National Park is located in southern Saskatchewan along the Montana border.
Cypress Hills Interprovincial Park, an interprovincial park straddling the southern Alberta-Saskatchewan border, located southeast of Medicine Hat. It is Canada's only interprovincial park.

Education 
Students in Bracken are bused to Frontier, which has a school that covers kindergarten through grade 12 in the Chinook School Division.

See also 

 List of communities in Saskatchewan
 Villages of Saskatchewan

References

Villages in Saskatchewan
Lone Tree No. 18, Saskatchewan
Division No. 4, Saskatchewan